Catoptria kasyi is a species of moth in the family Crambidae. It is found in the Republic of Macedonia and Albania.

References

Crambini
Moths of Europe
Moths described in 1960